Bradford Bennett (born Brandsford Bennett; October 31, 1916 – July 8, 1981), was an American Negro league outfielder, first baseman and second baseman active in the 1940s.

Early life
Bennett was born on October 31, 1916 in Obion, Tennessee; the youngest of two children born to Laurence D. and Edna May Bennett (né Brown). By 1920, the family had relocated to Fulton, Kentucky.

Career
Bradford Bennett made his Negro leagues debut in 1940 with the St. Louis–New Orleans Stars. Returning to the Stars in 1941, he was widely touted as "the boy wonder of the American circuit." In 1942, Bennett spent an abbreviated season with the New York Black Yankees. There, he divided his time primarily between left field and first base and acquired the short lived nickname "Buck" Bennett before being drafted and serving in the U.S. Army for the remainder of World War II.

In 1946, Bennett returned, only to find yet another truncated season. Signing with the Boston Blues of Branch Rickey's soon-to-be-defunct USL, the once highly valued outfielder appeared only sporadically (and primarily as a second baseman), but did contribute a number of timely hits, including some tape-measure blasts. Case in point, Pittsburgh, May 19, when Bennett's ninth-inning line drive "over the huge Forbes Field scoreboard" gave Boston a 5-4 victory over the Pittsburgh Crawfords. On June 11, the main point of interest in Boston's rain-shortened 3-0 win over Brooklyn was Bennett's "mammoth home run," launched in the 4th inning with one aboard. The Lancaster New Era dubbed it Stumpf Field's "longest home run of the season," adding:[T]he big thrill of the night came when Brad Bennett, second sacker for the Blues, blasted one over the left field fence in the fourth inning. The customers, of course, have seen home runs knocked over that particular section of Stumpf Field, but it's been some time since they saw one sail so high and far away. Actually, the wallop carried the ball over the tree-tops that tower over the fence.
On August 12, Bennett helped his team – then struggling to retake first place from the surging Crawfords – eke out a much needed 7-5 win with two singles and a booming triple "that rolled almost out to the 520 foot marker in center field."

References

Further reading

Articles

 Star staff (May 19, 1940). "All Stars Humble Black Barons, 13-2". The Anniston Star. p. 13 
 Courier staff (August 3, 1940). "Memphis, Stars in New York Classic". The Pittsburgh Courier. p. 17
 Star and Times staff (August 30, 1940). "Negro Hurler Fans 12 of 16 Men He Faces as Pelicans Beat All-Stars". The St. Louis Star and Times. p. 21 
 Palmer, John G. (July 25, 1941). "Bushwicks Take On Another Team of the Negro-American League". The Brooklyn Citizen. p. 6
 A S-N staff (May 2, 1942). "With Eyes Trained ...". New York Amsterdam Star-News. p. 14
 Posey, Cum. (May 9, 1942). "Posey's Points". The Pittsburgh Courier. p. 16
 Afro-American staff (May 16, 1942). "Cubans Set for Opener Against Yanks in N.Y.". Afro-American. p. 22
 News-Messenger staff (June 1, 1942). "Black Yanks Claim Game's Best Infield". The Fremont News-Messenger. p. 9.
 Eagle staff (June 5, 1942). "Parkways to Vie with Black Yanks". The Brooklyn Daily Eagle. p. 14
 Eagle staff (June 12, 1942). "Boland Rejoins Bushwick Club; To Play Sunday". The Brooklyn Daily Eagle. p. 14 
 Courier staff (July 11, 1942). "12,000 Witness Stadium Classic". The Pittsburgh Courier. p. 16
 Courier staff (August 22, 1942). "Yanks-Sox in 2-2 Deadlock". The Pittsburgh Courier. p. 17 
 Star-Press staff (April 28, 1946). "Kuhner Nine Plays Boston in Opener". The Muncie Star-Press. p. 14.
 P-G staff (May 20, 1946). "Crawfords Lose Two". Pittsburgh Post-Gazette. p. 17.
 Blizzard staff (May 27, 1946). "Pittsburgh and Boston to Play U.S. Loop Game". The Oil City Blizzard. p. 7.
 Blizzard staff (May 31, 1946). "Boston Blues Nip Crawfords". The Oil City Blizzard. p. 10.
 Eagle Staff (June 9, 1946). "Brown Dodgers in Two with Boston Blues" The Brooklyn Daily Eagle. p. 25.
 New Era staff (June 12, 1946). "Homer Blasted as Boston Tops Brooklyn Here: Over the Trees!". Lancaster New Era. p. 14. 
 Post-Standard staff (July 7, 1946). "Pitt Crawfords Face Boston Blues". The Syracuse Post-Standard. p. 12.
 Star/Record staff (August 14, 1946). "Boston Blues Drub Crawford in League Tilt". Bradford Evening Star and Daily Record. p. 7.

Books
 Peterson, Robert (1970; 1992). Only the Ball was White: A History of Legendary Black Players and All-Black Professional Teams. p. 316. .
 Plott, William J. (2019). Black Baseball's Last Team Standing: The Birmingham Black Barons, 1919-1962. Jefferson, NC: McFarland & Company, Inc. p. 280. .

External links
  and Seamheads

1916 births
1981 deaths
20th-century African-American sportspeople
United States Army personnel of World War II
African Americans in World War II
St. Louis–New Orleans Stars players
New York Black Yankees players
Baseball outfielders
Baseball players from Kentucky
People from Fulton, Kentucky
African-American United States Army personnel